Lazona may refer to:

Lazona, cultural region traditionally inhabited by the Laz people
 Lazona Kawasaki Plaza, a shopping mall in Saiwai-ku, Kawasaki, Japan